Hacène Djemaâ (born 6 January 1942) is an Algerian footballer. He played in ten matches for the Algeria national football team from 1966 to 1968. He was also named in Algeria's squad for the 1968 African Cup of Nations tournament.

References

External links
 

1942 births
Living people
Algerian footballers
Algeria international footballers
1968 African Cup of Nations players
Competitors at the 1967 Mediterranean Games
Mediterranean Games competitors for Algeria
Association football midfielders
Footballers from Algiers
20th-century Algerian people